Armco Park Mound I is an archaeological site near Otterbein, Ohio. It was listed in the National Register of Historic Places on May 29, 1975. Publication of the location of this site by the United States government is restricted under the Archaeological Resources Protection Act of 1979.

See also
 List of Registered Historic Places in Warren County, Ohio
 List of burial mounds in the United States
 Protected area

References 

National Register of Historic Places in Warren County, Ohio
Archaeological sites on the National Register of Historic Places in Ohio
Geography of Warren County, Ohio
Mounds in Ohio